"Ordinary Day" is a song written and performed by Vanessa Carlton from her 2002 debut album, Be Not Nobody. Carlton wrote the song when she was 17 and was the first song that she had ever written in only one sitting. Released as a single on July 1, 2002, the song peaked at number 30 on the US Billboard Hot 100.

When Carlton performs the song live, she uses some of the original lyrics that she wrote for the song rather than the ones recorded for the album version. On the album, the lyrics at the end of the chorus are "Don't you see your dreams lie right in the palm of your hand?" and in the live version Vanessa sings "If we walk now, we will divide and conquer this land".

Music video
The video was directed by Marc Klasfeld, who also directed the music video for her previous hit single "A Thousand Miles". The video begins with Vanessa writing the song's title in a diary. As she starts to sing "just a boy, just an ordinary boy", a boy appears behind her. The video continues with her playing the piano and walking in a large field filled with people hugging and kissing each other under a solar eclipse.

Charts

Release history

References

2002 singles
2002 songs
Music videos directed by Marc Klasfeld
Pop ballads
Song recordings produced by Ron Fair
Songs written by Vanessa Carlton
Vanessa Carlton songs